Charcot Land is a peninsula of Eastern Greenland, part of the Scoresby Sound system. It lies in the Northeast Greenland National Park zone. 

The area is remote and uninhabited. It was named after French Polar explorer Jean-Baptiste Charcot (1867–1936) during aerial surveys by Lauge Koch as part of the Three-year Expedition to East Greenland.

Geography
Charcot Land is a mountainous region. It is bound to the south by the Daugaard-Jensen Glacier, beyond which lies Hinksland. To the north lies the F. Graae Glacier and to the east the head of the Nordvestfjord, its easternmost point being a headland named Kap Ursus Major. 

To the west are a number of nunataks and the Greenland ice sheet.

Bibliography
A. K. Higgins, Jane A. Gilotti, M. Paul Smith (eds.), The Greenland Caledonides: Evolution of the Northeast Margin of Laurentia.

References

External links
Palaeoproterozoic age of a basement gneiss complex in the Charcot Land tectonic window, East Greenland Caledonides

Geography of Greenland
Geography of the Arctic